Shishkin is a Russian masculine surname. Its feminine counterpart is Shishkina. The surname is derived from the sobriquet "шишка" ("pinecone"), or from  'to swell', and may refer to:
Aleksey Shishkin, Russian Gypsy arranger and composer
Aleksandr Shishkin (born 1966), Russian football player
Alla Shishkina (born 1989), Russian competitor in synchronized swimming
Andrey Shishkin (born 1960), Russian painter
Boris Schischkin (1886–1963), Russian botanist
Dasha Shishkin (born 1977), Russian-American artist 
Dmitry Shishkin (born 1992), Russian pianist
Georgy Shishkin (born 1948), Russian painter
Ivan Shishkin (1832–1898), Russian painter
Mikhail Shishkin (writer) (born 1961), Russian writer
Mikhail Shishkin (footballer) (born 1980), Russian association football player
Nikolai Shishkin (1845-1911), Russian gypsy singer-arranger-composer from Kursk
Oleg Şişchin (born 1975), Moldovan footballer
Olga Shishkina (born 1985), Russian-born musician
Olga Shishkina (physicist), Russian physicist
Pavel Shishkin (born 1970), Russian businessman
Roman Shishkin (born 1987), Russian footballer
Sergey Shishkin (born 1973), Russian footballer
Svetlana Malahova-Shishkina (born 1977), Kazakhstani cross-country skier 
Tatyana Shishkina (born 1969), Kazakhstani judoka
Vadim Shishkin (born 1969), Ukrainian chess grandmaster
Viktor Shishkin (born 1955), Russian footballer
Vladimir Shishkin (born 1964), Russian hurdler
Vladimir Shishkin (boxer) (born 1991), Russian boxer
Vyacheslav Shishkin (born 1993), Russian footballer
Yuri Shishkin (born 1963), Russian footballer

For the minor planet 3558 Shishkin, see List of minor planets: 3001-4000

Russian-language surnames